(V plenu u sakury) is a 2019 Japanese war film directed by Masaki Inoue. A joint Japan-Russia co-production, the movie is based on the true story of a prison camp in Matsuyama, Ehime Prefecture, during the Russo-Japanese War.

Plot
In the present day, a journalist named Sakurako Takamiya works for a local TV station. She researches into the Russian prisoners of war cemetery that local students keep clean. Her boss Shiro Kurata tells her about a letter from Russian Army officer named Alexander Sorokin, which was addressed to a nurse named Yui Takeda. They travel to Russia to look into Sorokin's diary.

In 1904, during the Russo-Japanese War, Yui takes care of the injured Sorokin at a prisoner of war camp in Matsuyama, Ehime Prefecture, Japan. At first, Yui hates Sorokin, because her younger brother died in the war. Her feelings change, as they fall in love under difficult circumstances.

Cast
Junko Abe as Yui Takeda/Sakurako Takamiya
Rodion Galyuchenko	as Alexander Sorokin
Yoko Yamamoto as Kikue Takamiya
Aleksandr Domogarov as Captain Vasily Boysman
Andrei Dementiev as Alexander Svyatopolk-mirsky
Naomasa Musaka as Yukichi Takeda
Hana Ebise	as Naka Takeda
Setsuko Kaida as Take Takeda
Ivan Gromov as Alexey Krushinsky
Issey Ogata as Commandant Kono
Takumi Saitoh as Shiro Kurata
Jtarô Sugisaku as TV cameraman
Rii Ishihara

Reception
The movie was screened at the opening of the Ehime International Film Festival pre-event on March 15, 2019. After being pre-released at a movie theater in Ehime Prefecture from the following 16th, it was released nationwide from 22nd. According to a survey by Kogyo Tsushinsha, it won first place in the mini theater audience mobilization ranking on March 22 and 23. In November 2019, the movie was released in 200 movie theatres across Russia.

At overseas film festivals, it was screened at the out of competition section of the 41st Moscow International Film Festival on April 24, 2019. It was screened in the competition section of the 12th Orenburg International Film Festival held in Orenburg, Russia from August 23 to 28, and won the Audience Grand Prix Special Award. On November, the movie won the Russia-Japan Friendship Contribution Award at the Russian Overseas Film Festival.

References

External links

2019 films
2010s Japanese-language films
Japanese war films
2010s war films
Films set in the Meiji period
Films set in Ehime Prefecture
2010s Japanese films